This is a list of cities and airports in Mexico that Aero California was serving in July 2008.  The airline was not serving any destinations in the U.S. at this time but had previously served Los Angeles, Phoenix, San Diego and Tucson.

Mexico

Baja California
Tijuana (General Abelardo L. Rodríguez International Airport) - focus city

Baja California Sur
La Paz (Manuel Márquez de León International Airport)

Chihuahua
Ciudad Juárez (Abraham González International Airport)
Chihuahua (Roberto Fierro Villalobos International Airport)

Coahuila
Torreón (Francisco Sarabia International Airport)

Colima
Colima (Lic. Miguel de la Madrid Airport)

Durango
Durango (General Guadalupe Victoria International Airport)

Mexican Federal District
Mexico City (Mexico City International Airport) - hub

Jalisco
Guadalajara (Don Miguel Hidalgo y Costilla International Airport) - focus city

Nayarit
Tepic (Amado Nervo National Airport)

Nuevo León
Monterrey (General Mariano Escobedo International Airport)

Puebla
Puebla (Hermanos Serdán International Airport)

Sinaloa
Culiacán (Federal de Bachigualato International Airport)
Los Mochis (Federal del Valle del Fuerte International Airport)
Mazatlán (General Rafael Buelna International Airport)

Sonora
Ciudad Obregón (Ciudad Obregón International Airport)
Hermosillo (General Ignacio Pesqueira Garcia International Airport)

Terminated destinations
Mexico - León (Del Bajío International Airport), Mérida (Manuel Crescencio Rejón International Airport), San Luis Potosí (Ponciano Arriaga International Airport), Veracruz (General Heriberto Jara International Airport), Villahermosa (Carlos Rovirosa Pérez International Airport)
USA - Los Angeles (Los Angeles International Airport), Phoenix, (Phoenix Sky Harbor International Airport), San Diego (Lindbergh Field), Tucson (Tucson International Airport)

References

Aero California